Kim Hye-ri (or  ; born 25 June 1990) is a South Korean footballer who plays for Hyundai Steel Red Angels and the South Korean national team. She participated at the 2015 FIFA Women's World Cup.

References

External links

1990 births
Living people
South Korean women's footballers
Women's association football defenders
South Korea women's under-20 international footballers
South Korea women's international footballers
Incheon Hyundai Steel Red Angels WFC players
WK League players
Asian Games medalists in football
Footballers at the 2010 Asian Games
Footballers at the 2014 Asian Games
Footballers at the 2018 Asian Games
Asian Games bronze medalists for South Korea
Medalists at the 2010 Asian Games
Medalists at the 2014 Asian Games
Medalists at the 2018 Asian Games
2015 FIFA Women's World Cup players
2019 FIFA Women's World Cup players
FIFA Century Club